Ram Kumar Panday (born 1946) is a Nepali geographer. He is regarded as the first proponent of the study of Nepalese geography. Separately, he was awarded the Humor Prize for lifetime achievement in creative humor literature and other promotional activities.

Biography 
At the beginning of his career as a geographer, Panday realised that classical geography did not satisfactorily explain the effects of altitude. In dealing with flat vision and views, the geography of height could not be properly explored or expounded. His fieldwork led to the study of the effects of altitude in Nepali geography. In the 1980s, he published a small preliminary study on the spatial distribution of settlements in the mountains of Nepal. He continued to confront the prospects and problems of altitude effects. Panday applied general aspects of geography to develop a model of the Earth along with its geographic features. In the 1970s, he visited remote reaches of the Himalayan districts and Nepali hill settlements, during the Panchayat system, and later traveled to Japan as a visiting professor at the Osaka City University. He studied a UN course of GIS and Remote Sensing in Sweden.

Satirist
In the political field, he satirized political corruption as an expense in developing nations. He has openly criticized the government, but also proposed ways for the development of the country through his own personal expertise. He has published more than sixty books and several papers on dimensional subjects and topics, both fiction and non-fiction.

Major Publication 

Ram Kumar Panday is also a poet and writer. He has created Japanese Haiku and Korean Sijo, small sized poems in Nepal. He has written more than 5,000 Nepali and several hundred English Haiku in Nepal.

Panday has also contributed in other fields:

See also

References 

1946 births
Nepalese academics
Living people
Nepalese geographers